The Actors' Temple, officially named Congregation Ezrath Israel, is a synagogue founded in 1917 in the Hell's Kitchen neighborhood of Manhattan, New York City, originally for the Orthodox shopkeepers in the area. Located at 339 West 47th Street since 1923, the temple was originally the West Side Hebrew Relief Association, and it was the synagogue of choice for the entertainment industry. Many vaudeville, musical theater, television, and nightclub performers attended services there, including Sophie Tucker, Shelley Winters, Milton Berle, Al Jolson, Jack Benny, Joe E. Lewis, Edward G. Robinson, as well as two of the Three Stooges.  Bernard Birstein, an aspiring actor himself, was the first rabbi; he died in 1959. 

The temple declined after World War II as actors moved to California and the neighborhood changed. The congregation diminished from 300 members to approximately 30 in 2009.   In 2005, in order to bring in additional income, the temple started renting out dance rehearsal space to New Dance Group as well as temporarily transforming into a theatre for plays.   However, even with this additional income, the $120,000 annual operating costs used up the $2 million endowment by 2009. Despite these challenges, the temple continues to operate. In 2011, the temple had a fundraising program and about 150 dues-paying members, with an average Friday night worship attendance of 20–30 people. The Temple was once Orthodox, transitioned to Conservative, and is now non-denominational.

References

External links 

 Official Site
 The Actor's Temple Theatre official site
 

Synagogues in Manhattan
Properties of religious function on the National Register of Historic Places in Manhattan
Jewish organizations established in 1917
Unaffiliated synagogues in New York City
Hell's Kitchen, Manhattan
Off-Broadway theaters
1917 establishments in New York City
Synagogues on the National Register of Historic Places in New York City